My Conception is an album by jazz pianist Sonny Clark, recorded for the Blue Note label and performed by Clark with Donald Byrd, Hank Mobley, Paul Chambers, and Art Blakey. It was originally released in 1979 in Japan, as GXF 3056, featuring six tracks recorded in 1959 including an alternate take of "Royal Flush", a track that had appeared on the album Cool Struttin'. The 2000 limited CD reissue also comprised the three additional tracks originally recorded for Sonny Clark Quintets, an album which never saw the light of the day until being released later only in Japan.

The album was awarded 4 stars in an Allmusic review by Michael G. Nastos which stated "Sonny Clark's conception of modern jazz is not far removed from his peer group of the late '50s, in that advanced melodic and harmonic ideas override the basic precepts of swing and simplicity. What sets Clark apart from other jazz pianists lies in his conception of democracy to allow his bandmates to steam straight ahead on compositions he has written with them in mind... Except the extraordinary Leapin' and Lopin', this album of contrasts, depth, and spirit showcases Clark's dual concepts brilliantly, and is only a half step below his best".

Track listing 
All compositions by Sonny Clark

 "Junka" - 7:30
 "Blues Blue" - 7:18
 "Minor Meeting" [Second Version] - 6:46
 "Royal Flush" [Second Version] - 7:00
 "Some Clark Bars" - 6:18
 "My Conception" - 4:44

Bonus tracks on CD:
"Minor Meeting" [First Version] - 6:54
 "Eastern Incident" - 8:14
 "Little Sonny" - 6:32

Recorded on December 8, 1957 (tracks 7-9) and March 29, 1959 (tracks 1-6).

Personnel 
 Sonny Clark - piano
 Donald Byrd - (tracks 1–6) trumpet 
 Hank Mobley (tracks 1–6),  Clifford Jordan (tracks 7–9) - tenor saxophone
 Kenny Burrell - guitar (tracks 7–9)
 Paul Chambers - bass
 Art Blakey (tracks 1–6), Pete LaRoca (tracks 7–9) - drums

Production 
 Alfred Lion - producer
 Reid Miles - design
 Rudy Van Gelder - engineer
 Francis Wolff - photography

References 

Sonny Clark albums
1979 albums
Blue Note Records albums
Albums produced by Alfred Lion
Albums recorded at Van Gelder Studio